Each team's roster consists of at least 15 skaters (forwards, and defencemen) and 2 goaltenders, and at most 20 skaters and 3 goaltenders. All ten participating nations, through the confirmation of their respective national associations, had to submit a roster by the first IIHF directorate.

Group A

Canada
The roster was announced on 6 March 2019.

Head Coach: Perry Pearn

Finland
The roster was announced on 25 March 2019.

Head Coach: Pasi Mustonen

Russia
A 26-player roster was announced on 21 March 2019. The final roster was revealed on 31 March 2019.

Head Coach: Alexei Chistyakov

Switzerland
The roster was announced on 6 March 2019.

Head Coach: Daniela Diaz

United States
The roster was announced on 1 March 2019.

Head Coach: Bob Corkum

Group B

Czech Republic
The roster was announced on 26 March 2019.

Head Coach: Petr Novák

France
The roster was announced on 6 March 2019.

Head Coach: Grégory Tarlé

Germany
The roster was announced on 29 March 2019.

Head Coach: Christian Künast

Japan
The roster was announced on 22 March 2019.

Head Coach: Yuji Iizuka

Sweden
The roster was announced on 19 March 2019.

Head Coach: Ylva Martinsen

References

External links
Official website

rosters
IIHF Women's World Championship rosters